Louis Oppenheim (1879–1936) was a German graphic artist, painter and type designer.

Born in Coburg, Oppenheim studied in London from 1899 to 1906. He moved to Berlin and started his work as a graphic artist in 1910, signing his work with his initials, "LO" and working for clients such as AES, the Reichsbahn, Persil and Adrema. His posters are considered a significant product of the 'Berlin poster style'. Oppenheim worked for the type foundry Berthold and created a handful of significant and widespread typefaces, all of which share modernist characteristics, such as Lo-Type and Fanfare which are still in wide use today. Also, he designed the first coin of the Weimar Republic in 1919.

See also
Lo-Type
Erik Spiekermann

References

German typographers and type designers
German graphic designers
German poster artists
19th-century German painters
19th-century German male artists
German male painters
20th-century German painters
20th-century German male artists
1879 births
1936 deaths